Uloma is a genus of darkling beetles in the family Tenebrionidae. There are at least 50 described species in Uloma.

Species
These 50 species belong to the genus Uloma:

 Uloma apicipennis (Fauvel, 1904) g
 Uloma artensis Perroud, 1864 g
 Uloma bonzica Marseul, 1876 i c g
 Uloma caledonica Kaszab, 1982 g
 Uloma clamensae L.Soldati, 2014 g
 Uloma condaminei L.Soldati, 2014 g
 Uloma crassestriata Kaszab, 1982 g
 Uloma damoiseaui Kaszab, 1982 g
 Uloma excisa g
 Uloma fauveli Kaszab, 1982 g
 Uloma formosana Kaszab, 1941 g
 Uloma fortestriata (Fauvel, 1904) g
 Uloma fukiensis Kaszab, 1954 g
 Uloma girardi Kaszab, 1982 g
 Uloma guadeloupensis Marcuzzi, 1971 g
 Uloma imberbis LeConte b
 Uloma impressa Melsh. g b
 Uloma isoceroides (Fauvel, 1904) g
 Uloma jourdani L.Soldati, 2014 g
 Uloma kergoati L.Soldati, 2014 g
 Uloma kuscheli Kaszab, 1982 g
 Uloma longula LeConte, 1861 g b
 Uloma major Laporte de Castelnau, 1840 g
 Uloma meifengensis Masumoto, 1982 g
 Uloma mentalis Horn g b
 Uloma microcephala (Fauvel, 1904) g
 Uloma miriceps (Fauvel, 1904) g
 Uloma miyakei Masumoto & Nishikawa, 1986 g
 Uloma monteithi Kaszab, 1986 g
 Uloma nakanei Masumoto & Nishikawa, 1986 g
 Uloma nanshanchica Masumoto & Nishikawa, 1986 g
 Uloma nomurai Masumoto, 1982 g
 Uloma novaecaledoniae Kaszab, 1982 g
 Uloma opaciceps Kaszab, 1982 g
 Uloma opacipennis (Fauvel, 1904) g
 Uloma pachysoma (Montrouzier, 1860) g
 Uloma paniei Kaszab, 1982 g
 Uloma polita (Wiedemann, 1821) g
 Uloma punctata (Fauvel, 1904) g
 Uloma punctulata LeConte b
 Uloma retusa Fabricius, 1801 g b
 Uloma robusta Kaszab, 1986 g
 Uloma rubripes g
 Uloma rufa (Piller & Mitterpacher, 1783) g
 Uloma sanguinipes (Fabricius, 1775) g
 Uloma sarasini Kaszab, 1982 g
 Uloma sauteri Kaszab, 1941 g
 Uloma sexdecimlineata Montrouzier, 1860 g
 Uloma takagii Masumoto & Nishikawa, 1986 g
 Uloma tsugeae Masumoto, 1982 g

Data sources: i = ITIS, c = Catalogue of Life, g = GBIF, b = Bugguide.net

Gallery

References

Further reading

External links

 

Tenebrioninae